The following is a list of Axe products:

Deodorants
Axe's list of yearly body-spray variants is as follows. Limited edition or short-lived variants are listed in a following table below and others.

Limited Edition variants
Axe also occasionally launches limited edition variants. that may be on sale for a few months or over a year.

Axe shower gels

Axe shampoos

Axe hair stylers

References

Unilever brands